John Creighton may refer to:

John Oliver Creighton (born 1943), American astronaut
John W. Creighton Jr. (born 1933), American businessman
John Creighton, 1st Earl Erne (1731–1828), Irish peer
John Creighton (archaeologist)
John Creighton (British Army officer) (1772–1833), son of the preceding, MP for Lifford (Parliament of Ireland constituency)
John Creighton, American naval officer involved in the Little Belt affair in 1811
John Creighton (judge) (1721–1807), lawyer and judge in Nova Scotia
John Creighton (warden) (1817–1885), merchant, politician and prison official in Ontario, Canada
John Creighton (Nova Scotia politician) (1794–1878), lawyer and politician in Nova Scotia, Canada
John A. Creighton (1831–1907), businessman in Omaha, Nebraska
John Creighton (rugby union) (born 1937), New Zealand rugby union player
John Creighton (surgeon) (1768–1827), president of the Royal College of Surgeons in Ireland
John Creighton (priest) (fl. 1643–1670), Chancellor of Christ Church Cathedral and Dean of Ferns

See also
Creighton (disambiguation)